The Westminster Presbyterian Church, located at 13th St. and N Street in Sacramento, California, was built in 1927. It was listed on the National Register of Historic Places in 2003.

It was deemed significant for its architecture.  The Presbyterian church was designed in "Spanish Eclectic" style with Byzantine influences as in the Hagia Sophia, by Sacramento architects Dean and Dean.  It has a bell tower and tiled dome.  It is constructed of reinforced concrete with stucco covering and decorations made of pre-cast cement.

Westminster Presbyterian Church is listed as an American Presbyterian and Reformed Historical Site No. 373 by the Presbyterian Historical Society.

See also
History of Sacramento, California
National Register of Historic Places listings in Sacramento County, California
California Historical Landmarks in Sacramento County, California

References

Churches in Sacramento, California
Churches in Sacramento County, California
Presbyterian churches in California
History of Sacramento, California
Churches completed in 1927
Churches on the National Register of Historic Places in California
National Register of Historic Places in Sacramento, California
Spanish Colonial Revival architecture in California
1927 establishments in California